Emmerich may refer to:

Places

 Emmerich am Rhein, city in North Rhine-Westphalia, Germany
 Emmerich Rhine Bridge
 Emmerich station
 Emmerich, Wisconsin, unincorporated community in the town of Berlin, Wisconsin, United States

Other uses
 Emmerich (name), a given name and a surname (including a list of people and fictional characters with the name)

See also
 Amalaric (died 531), King of the Visigoths
 Haimirich, a surname
 Aimery (disambiguation) (also Aimery, Amalrich), French forms
 Amerigo (disambiguation) (also Emerico, Almerigo, Almerico, Aimerico), Italian forms
 Imre, Hungarian form